Qingnian Road Station, is a station of Line 2 of Wuhan Metro. It entered revenue service on December 28, 2012. It is located in Jianghan District.

Station layout

Gallery

References

Wuhan Metro stations
Line 2, Wuhan Metro
Railway stations in China opened in 2012